The Episcopal Diocese of Northern Indiana, originally called the Episcopal Diocese of Michigan City, is the diocese of the Episcopal Church in the United States of America with jurisdiction over the northern one-third of Indiana. It is in Province 5 and its cathedral,  the Cathedral of St. James, is in South Bend, as are the diocesan offices.

Description
The Episcopal Diocese of Northern Indiana has 33 parishes and missions in 31 counties of northern Indiana. Except for Tippecanoe County, all counties in the state straddling or lying north of 40º 30' North latitude are in the diocese. Fort Wayne is the largest city in the diocese followed by South Bend, Gary, and Elkhart. Cities in the diocese with more than one parish are Fort Wayne and South Bend with three each, and Elkhart, Gary and Michigan City with two each.

History
In October, 1888, the General Convention of the Episcopal Church in the United States of America approved splitting the Episcopal Diocese of Indiana into the Episcopal Diocese of Michigan City covering the northern one-third of the state and the Episcopal Diocese of Indianapolis covering the rest. John Hazen White, the Bishop of Indiana at the time elected to become bishop of Michigan City and was consecrated on April 25, 1899. A new bishop was elected for Indianapolis and he was consecrated September 21, 1899.

Bishop of the Episcopal Diocese of Northern Indiana

Current bishop
Doug Sparks is the eighth and current bishop of the diocese.

List of bishops

The bishops of Northern Indiana have been:
  1.  John Hazen White 1899–1925 (deceased) was previously 4th Bishop of Indiana
  2.  Campbell Gray  1925–1944  (deceased)
  3.  Reginald Mallett 1944–1963  (deceased)
  4.  Walter Conrad Klein 1963–1972  (deceased)
  5.  William C. R. Sheridan 1972–87 (deceased)
  6.  Francis Campbell Gray 1987–1998 elected coadjutor 1986, grandson of No. 2 and later Asst. Bishop of Virginia
  7.  Edward S. Little II 2000–2016
  8.  Douglas Sparks 2016–present

St. James Memorial Chapel
The first four bishops of Northern Indiana are buried in the crypt of St. James Memorial Chapel on the grounds of Howe Military School in Howe, Indiana. The wives of the first three bishops are also buried there. Note: The fifth bishop, William C. R. Sheridan, who died September 24, 2005, at his home in Culver, Indiana, was buried in New Oakhill Cemetery, Plymouth, Indiana.

See also

 Succession of Bishops of the Episcopal Church in the United States

Bibliography

 Lilly, Eli, History of the Little Church on the Circle: Christ Church Parish, Indianapolis, 1837-1953 (Indianapolis:Christ Episcopal Church, 1957, while it is a parish history of what is now the cathedral of the Diocese of Indianapolis, contains some material on the early history of the Episcopal Church in Indiana and Jackson Kemper, Missionary Bishop of Indiana and Missouri. It also has information on the split of the state into two dioceses.

References

External links
 Episcopal Diocese of Northern Indiana website
 Cathedral of St. James, South Bend website
 LaGrange County Cemetery Burial Listing - St. James Chapel
 Journal of the Proceedings of the Annual Convention, Diocese of Northern Indiana

Northern Indiana
Diocese of Northern Indiana
Religious organizations established in 1899
Anglican dioceses established in the 19th century
Province 5 of the Episcopal Church (United States)